Clas Ragnar Lindberg (born 24 August 1956) is a Swedish director and screenwriter. Lindberg studied at Dramatiska Institutet in Stockholm. He won the award for Best Screenplay for the film Underground Secrets at the 27th Guldbagge Awards. At the 29th Guldbagge Awards he won the award for Best Director for the film The Ferris Wheel.

Direction
 2004 – Farväl
 2003 – Don't Cry Wolf
 2002 – Pappa polis
 1998 – Pip-Larssons
 1997 – Min vän shejken i Stureby
 1996 – Att stjäla en tjuv
 1991 – Underground Secrets

Screenwriting
 2003 – Don't Cry Wolf
 1996 – Att stjäla en tjuv

References

External links

Swedish screenwriters
Swedish male screenwriters
Swedish film directors
1956 births
Living people
Best Director Guldbagge Award winners
Best Screenplay Guldbagge Award winners
Dramatiska Institutet alumni